David Kandel (1520–1592) was a Renaissance artist and one of the pioneers of botanical and natural history illustration. Very little is known of his personal life.

Biography
He was probably born in Strasbourg, in 1520.  He married in 1554 and 33 years later, in 1587, was recorded as "owner of a house".  He died in 1592. His works and woodcuts are diverse in subject, from botanical illustrations to biblical events.

The Kreuterbuch (or “The Book of the Herbs”), by Hieronymus Bock, used woodcuts of a quality far ahead of the time. Commissioned by Bock, Kandel contributed some 550 woodcuts to the second edition published in 1546. 

The woodcut “Rhinoceros”, for the work Cosmographia (or “Cosmography”) by Sebastian Munster, is based on the Dürer sketch.

References

1520 births
1592 deaths
Renaissance artists
Botanical illustrators